Sarah Denholm is a Scottish rugby Union player. Her international debut for Scotland women's national rugby union team, was against Wales on 17 November 2019.

Career 
She played for Scotland under 20s. She played for  University of Edinburgh. 

In 2019, she played for Scotland women's national rugby sevens team. She competed in 2019–20 Scottish Rugby Academy season, with Edinburgh. 

She plays for Biggar Rugby Football Club.

References 

Scottish rugby union players
Scottish rugby sevens players
Year of birth missing (living people)
Living people